ELH may refer to:

 ELH, a literary academic journal
 Czech Extraliga, a Czech ice hockey league
 Eastlake High School (Chula Vista, California), a four-year high school
 El Hugeirat language
 Elh Kmer (born 1995), Cameroon-born French rapper
 Evangelical Lutheran Hymnary
 North Eleuthera Airport, on Eleuthera, Bahamas